On Your Mark, Get Set... is the debut album by Gobotron, the solo side project of Manchester Orchestra lead guitarist and backing vocalist Robert "Robot" McDowell, released on January 19, 2010, through Favorite Gentlemen Recordings.

The album was recorded by McDowell himself in the summer of 2008, doing all the writing and playing all the instruments, as a solo project in the Favorite Gentlemen Studios in Atlanta, upon returning from Manchester Orchestra's 2008 headlining tour. Upon going into the pre-production of Manchester Orchestra's second album Mean Everything to Nothing in late 2008, McDowell had to delay the work on this album until summer 2009 when it was finally mixed and mastered.

"Never Turn Around" was featured on Rookie Blue, on the episode "Big Nickel".

Track listing

Personnel
All songs written, performed, recorded, and mixed by Robert "Robot" McDowell
Mastered by Chris Griffin
Recorded and mixed at Favorite Gentlemen Recording Studios, Atlanta, Georgia

References

2010 albums